Nicholas Lander is an Australian botanist.

References

External links

1948 births
Living people
Botanists active in Australia
20th-century Australian botanists
21st-century Australian botanists